Tanja Damaske (born 16 November 1971 in East Berlin) is a retired German track and field athlete who competed in the javelin throw. She is best known for winning the gold medal at the 1998 European Championships. A year earlier she earned a bronze medal at the World Championships. A five-time German Champion in the women's javelin throw, she retired from competition in 2003.

References
 
 Profile 

1971 births
Living people
Athletes from Berlin
German female javelin throwers
German national athletics champions
World Athletics Championships athletes for Germany
World Athletics Championships medalists
European Athletics Championships medalists
Universiade medalists in athletics (track and field)
Universiade silver medalists for Germany
Medalists at the 1993 Summer Universiade
East German female javelin throwers
20th-century German women